Countess Xenia Czernichev-Besobrasov (Chernysheva-Besobrasova ; 11 June 1929, Paris20 September 1968, Casteau, Belgium) was the first wife of Archduke Rudolf of Austria, the youngest son of the last reigning Emperor of Austria-Hungary, Charles I.

Background
She was the younger daughter of Count Sergei Czernyshev-Besobrasov (later of New York City) by his wife Countess Elisabeth Dmitrievna Sheremeteva, and has descended from two prominent Russian comital families. Xenia's father, Count Sergei, was a czarist courtier whose father was made a Russian count in 1908 as the son-in-law of the last Count Chernyshev-Kruglikov (that family, now extinct, itself rose to comital status in 1832, by marriage to the heiress of the extinct Chernyshev family, counts in Russia since 1742). Count Sergei fled Russia after the Revolution, and settled in the United States with his wife Elizabeth, his son Alexander, and two daughters Irina and Xenia. In 1949, his older daughter Irina married Prince Teymuraz Bagration (1912-1992) as his second wife, without issue. Teymuraz's mother was Princess Tatiana of Russia.

Xenia was an alumna of Miss Hall's School in Pittsfield, Massachusetts. She then attended Smith College for two years, but did not graduate.  At the time of her engagement, she worked for Air France, and was based in New York City.

Marriage
The engagement between Archduke Rudolf and Countess Xenia Czernichev-Besobrasov was announced on 30 April 1953. The couple were married on 23 June 1953 at Our Lady of Mt. Carmel Roman Catholic Church at Tuxedo Park, New York, where Rudolf and his mother the Dowager Empress Zita were said to live on a "large estate". The wedding, officiated by Bishop Fulton J. Sheen, was attended by over 100 guests, including Dowager Empress Zita. The press reports claim that this was the first imperial marriage in the United States, but the first such marriage was actually between Napoleon's younger brother Jérôme Bonaparte and an American heiress Elizabeth Patterson (Betsey Patterson).

On the bride's side, the guests included Princess Vera of Russia (her brother-in-law Prince Teymuraz's maternal aunt), Count Hilarion Woronzow-Dashkow, a distant cousin, the bride's brother Alexander Czernichev-Besobrasov, and his wife.

Countess Xenia Czernichev-Besobrasov was one of the first non-royal brides to marry into the former Imperial House of Austria in what would be accepted as an equal marriage, despite the relative obscurity of her father's family and the recentness of his title. The Habsburg house laws had been changed by former Crown Prince Otto of Austria in 1953 to permit archdukes to marry outside ruling and formerly reigning houses for the first time, permitting cadet archdukes to marry into increasingly minor noble houses.

She was the second Russian Orthodox royal bride to become an archduchess of Austria, the first being Grand Duchess Alexandra Pavlovna of Russia, first wife of Archduke Joseph, Palatine of Hungary.

Subsequent life
Archduke Rudolf worked at the time of his marriage in a New York City private banking firm. Rudolph and Xenia planned to make their home in New York, but their children were born in various countries, mostly the Belgian Congo.

All three of Xenia's children who lived to adulthood made princely marriages:
 Archduchess Maria Anna (born 19 May 1954) on 24 November 1981 in Brussels married Prince Peter Dimitrovich Galitzine (born 1955), and has issue:
Princess Xenia Petrovna Galitzine (23 May 1983 in Summit, New York). 
Princess Tatiana Petrovna Galitzine (16 August 1984 in Santa Clara, California).
Princess Alexandra Petrovna Galitzine (7 August 1986 in San Jose, California).
Princess Maria Petrovna Galitzine (11 May 1988, Luxembourg City – 4 May 2020, Houston). 
Prince Dimitri Petrovich Galitzine (11 June 1990 in Luxembourg City).
Prince Ionn Teimouraz Petrovich Galitzine (27 May 1992 in Luxembourg City). 
 Archduke Carl Peter (born 13 October 1955) married on 2 May 1998 at Ellingen Castle in Bavaria Princess Alexandra von Wrede (born 1970), a niece of his father's second wife, and has issue:
Archduchess Antonia (born 31 December 2000 in Munich).
Archduke Lorenz (born 18 April 2003 in Munich).
 Archduke Simeon of Austria (born 29 June 1958) married on 13 July 1996 Princess María of Bourbon-Two Sicilies (born 1967), daughter of Infante Carlos, Duke of Calabria, claimed Head of the Royal House of Bourbon-Two Sicilies and first cousin to Juan Carlos I of Spain, and of his wife, born Princess Anne d'Orléans (daughter of the Count of Paris, claimant to the throne of France). They have issue, five children. 
 Archduke Johannes Karl (1962-1975), died in a bicycle accident.

Xenia was killed on 20 September 1968 when the car she was in with her husband collided with a truck. Her husband was seriously injured. She was buried on the grounds of the Chateau de Belœil in Belgium.

Xenia's widower, Archduke Rudolf remarried Princess Anna Gabriele von Wrede in 1971 and had further issue.

Ancestry

References

External links
  Article based on a wedding announcement from American newspaper reports (Sources not cited).

1929 births
1968 deaths
Xenia
Countesses of the Russian Empire
Princesses by marriage
Road incident deaths in France
Smith College alumni